The Minerva class is a series of corvettes of the Italian Navy. They were built in two batches of four units during the 1980s and 1990s. The ships have fairly good speed and armament, including a 76 mm general-purpose gun, but, due to their emphasis on anti-submarine warfare, they lack anti-ship missile capabilities. These units are designed to operate in coastal areas. Their main missions include sea policing, patrol, fisheries protection, and naval commando training. Four ships of this class are now active with Bangladesh Coast Guard as offshore patrol vessels (OPVs).

Ships of the class

Leader-class offshore patrol vessel

Four ships of this class, namely Minerva, Urania, Danaide and Sibilla, were acquired by the Bangladesh Coast Guard. These ships were reclassified as Leader-class offshore patrol vessels. Before delivery, each ship's weapons and sensor systems were removed and replaced with one Oerlikon KBA 25 mm gun and modern sensors appropriate to coast guard roles. A helipad was added at the stern of each ship to accommodate a search and rescue helicopter.

Citations

References

 
Corvette classes
Ships built by Fincantieri
Ships built in Italy
Corvettes of the Italian Navy